Unappropriate is the third studio album by Michael Carr's comedy character Buddy Goode. It was officially released both digitally and on CD in stores on 17 August 2012.

The album won an ARIA Award in the category of Best Comedy Release at the 2012 ceremony.

Track listing

References

External links
Official Website
CD Edition
iTunes Edition

Buddy Goode albums
2012 albums
ARIA Award-winning albums